The Reform Star Party (PBR) was a political party in Indonesia. The party was merged into the Great Indonesia Movement Party in 2011.

Background 

The party began as a movement within the United Development Party (PPP) to depose Vice-president Hamzah Haz from the chairmanship, which he held for the 1998–2003 term, as it was felt he would not have time to run the party and hold the vice-presidency. The movement's leader was Zainuddin MZ, an Islamic preacher and chairman of the party's central leadership. He and other dissatisfied party members planned to establish a new party to be called the PPP Reformasi (PPP Reform). After a meeting between the discontents and Hamzah Haz, Hamzah agreed to accommodate the demands of Zainuddin's group for a restructuring and regeneration of the PPP leadership. Zainuddin said he did not want to be responsible for the breakup of the PPP.  A "Team of 7" was established to undertake the changes, but Zainuddin sent the PPP leadership a letter stating that he was not prepared to sit on the team as it was not in accordance with party rules. On January 8, 2002, Zainuddin resigned from the PPP and on January 20 declared the formation of the PPP Reformasi with a logo similar to that of the PPP but with five stars added. As the 2002 Election Law did not allow parties to use existing party names or symbols, the PPP Reformasi became the Reform Star Party with a new symbol.

The party was beset by internal conflict. As a result of tension between Zainuddin and Zaenal Ma'arif, two of the party's founders, an extraordinary party congress was held in April 2006. This saw the expulsion of Zaenal, who had wanted to become party chairman. Subsequently, other party members joined other parties, including Zainuddin himself, who joined the Great Indonesia Movement Party (Gerindra).

Electoral record
In the 2004 Indonesian legislative elections, the party won 2.4% of the popular vote and 14 out of 550 seats and established its own faction in the People's Representative Council. The party's target for the 2009 legislative election was 7 percent. However, it won only 1.2 percent of the votes, less than the 2.5 percent electoral threshold, meaning it lost all of its seats in the legislature.

References

2002 establishments in Indonesia
Islamic political parties in Indonesia
Islamism in Indonesia
Political parties established in 2002
Political parties in Indonesia